Dunbar Township may refer to the following townships in the United States:

 Dunbar Township, Faribault County, Minnesota
 Dunbar Township, Fayette County, Pennsylvania